Remiremont station (French: Gare de Remiremont) is a railway station serving the commune of Remiremont, Vosges department, France. The station is owned and operated by SNCF, in the TER Grand Est regional rail network and is served by TGV inOui and TER trains.

See also 

 List of SNCF stations in Grand Est

References 

Railway stations in Vosges (department)
Railway stations in France opened in 1864